Cainan (from  Qēnān, Kēnān) is mentioned in the Septuagint, the Greek translation of the Book of Genesis, the Book of Jubilees and the genealogy of Jesus given in Luke 3:36 in the New Testament. He is described as a son of Arpachshad and father of Salah, who lived in the time between Noah and Abraham. 

The postdiluvian Cainan does not appear in the (Proto-)Masoretic Text, the most common Hebrew version of Genesis, where Arpachshad is noted as the father of Salah. He is also omitted from the writings of the Jewish historian Josephus. However Helen Jacobus has argued that the omission from the Masoretic text is deliberate.

Despite his name being omitted from the Masoretic text, a substantial number of traditions about this other Cainan exist in the history of literature:

According to the Book of Jubilees, Cainan was taught to read by his father, and he found, carved on the rocks by former generations, an inscription preserving the science of astrology as taught by the Watchers, who had rebelled from God before the deluge. He is also stated to have married a daughter of Madai named Melka. 

In The Patriarchal Age: or, the History and Religion of Mankind (1854), George Smith writes:

References 

Book of Genesis people
Gospel of Luke
Book of Jubilees